This article contains information about the literary events and publications of 1746.

Events
May 9 – Voltaire, on being admitted into the Académie française, gives a discours de réception in which he criticizes Boileau's poetry.
June 18 – Samuel Johnson signs a contract to compile A Dictionary of the English Language for a group of London booksellers at a literary breakfast.
August 28 – A Native American massacre on this day of two white families in Deerfield, Massachusetts, gives rise to the first known poem by an African American, Lucy Terry, at the time a slave of around 16: "Bars Fight, August 28, 1746".
October 4 – Irish actor Spranger Barry makes his London stage debut in the title role of Othello at the Theatre Royal, Drury Lane (with Charles Macklin as Iago).
unknown dates
The probable first performance of Carlo Goldoni's comedy Servant of Two Masters takes place at the Teatro San Samuele in Venice.
The oldest manuscript of Jean de Joinville's Life of Saint Louis is rediscovered in Brussels.
Élie Catherine Fréron founds his controversial journal Lettres de la comtesse de...

New books

Prose
John Arbuthnot (died 1735) – Miscellanies
John Collier as "Tim Bobbin" – A View of the Lancashire Dialect by way of dialogue between Tummus... and Meary...
Zachary Grey – A Word or Two of Advice to William Warburton
James Hervey – Meditations Among the Tombs
Soame Jenyns – The Modern Fine Gentleman
Jacques Rochette de La Morlière – Angola
Pierre Louis Maupertuis – Astronomie nautique, volume 2
Tobias Smollett – Advice
Lauritz de Thurah – Den Danske Vitruvius, volume I
John Upton – Critical Observations on Shakespeare
Horace Walpole – The Beauties
John Wesley
The Principles of a Methodist Father Explain'd
Sermons on Several Occasions

Drama
Charles Macklin – Henry VII
Pierre de Marivaux – Le Préjugé vaincu
Takeda Izumo I, Takeda Izumo II, Namiki Sōsuke and Miyoshi Shōraku – Sugawara Denju Tenarai Kagami

Poetry
Thomas Blacklock – Poems
William Collins – Odes
Thomas Cooke – A Hymn to Liberty
Christian Fürchtegott Gellert – Fabeln und Erzählungen (Fables and Stories) (in verse)
Joseph Warton – Odes on Various Subjects
See also 1746 in poetry

Births
January 12 – Johann Heinrich Pestalozzi, Swiss educational reformer (died 1827)
January 25 – Stéphanie Félicité, comtesse de Genlis, French writer, harpist, educator (died 1830)
March 27 – Michael Bruce, Scottish poet (died 1767)
April 3 – Jean-Baptiste Cousin de Grainville, French fantasy novelist (died 1805)
December 21 – José de la Cruz (Huseng Sisiw), Filipino writer (died 1829)
unknown date – Victor d'Hupay, French philosopher (died 1818)

Deaths
February 4 – Robert Blair, Scottish member of the "Graveyard poets" (born 1699)
February 8 – Anton Josef Kirchweger, Latin Pietist author (year of birth unknown)
May 16 – Moshe Chaim Luzzatto, Italian Jewish rabbi, kabbalist, and philosopher (born 1707)
May 22 – Thomas Southerne, Irish dramatist (born 1660)
November 12 – Mary Leapor, English kitchenmaid poet (born 1722; died of measles)
December 6 – Lady Grizel Baillie, Scottish poet (born 1665)
unknown date – Frederic Count de Thoms, German biographer of King Louis XIV of France and art collector (born 1669)

References

 
Years of the 18th century in literature